Thubana binotella is a moth in the family Lecithoceridae. It was described by Francis Walker in 1864. It is found on Borneo.

Adults are cupreous purple, the forewings with a pale yellow transverse spot decreasing in breadth from the middle of the costa to the disc. There are four minute pale yellow oblique streaks near the tip of the costa.

References

Moths described in 1864
Thubana